Child marriage is practiced in some parts of Pakistan, with the highest prevalence in the Sindh province. It disproportionately affects the girl child. According to UNICEF report from 2018, around 18% of the girls in Pakistan are married before the age of 18 giving it the lowest rate of child marriage in South Asia after Sri Lanka. Child marriage occurs most often in rural and the primary driving factor is poverty among the low-income households where education is minimal.

Causes for Child Marriages 
Early and child marriage are directly attributable to deep-rooted gender inequalities, traditional practices, and customs.

The close relationship between female chastity and family honour forces family members to marry girls at an early age to prevent sexual transgressions and consequent damage to family reputation. The conceptualization of the girl child as ‘other’s property’ who has to eventually move to her husband’s home prevents parents from investing in their daughter’s education and daughters thus are married off at an early age to relieve parents of their ‘burden'.

The problem of child marriage is at times justified on the basis of religious foundations. Historically, it can be explained as a reaction to invasions by foreigners; desire to perpetuate the cult of the family by marrying the son early; by marrying the daughter early to escape the discredit caused to the family by the presence of grown-up maiden; or by desire of the mother to marry her son early so that she may sooner obtain the possession of a daughter-in-law in whom the mother could inculcate her habits of obedience and who could share the domestic chores with the mother. In the case of parents, sometimes it is due to their keenness to relieve themselves of the responsibility of marrying their daughter. They are also considered socially acceptable for reasons of responsibility and economically desirable for saving marriage expenses, bride price/ dowry.

In certain peculiar situations, it takes place under what is known as dand or bada in Sindh, vani in Punjab, and swara in Khyber Pakhtunkhwa and the tribal areas. In this practice, an accused family gives its girl or girls in marriage to an aggrieved family to settle a blood feud between the two parties.

In addition to being covered by the Child Marriage Restraint Act 1929, such marriages are also covered by section 310-A of the PPC (Pakistan Penal Code 1860), and are liable to be imprisoned up to a term of seven years but not less than three years and liable to a fine of Rs 500,000.

At times, women and girl children are deprived of their property rights by symbolically marrying them to the Quran. This ensures that the girl child will not bear children in the future and will not demand her rightful share in the family property. Sometimes poor parents who cannot afford to marry their daughters rely on this symbolic arrangement.

Section 498-C of the PPC prohibits marriage with the Quran. A person found guilty of arranging, facilitating or compelling such marriage of a female is liable imprisoned for a period extending to seven years but not less than three years and a fine of up to Rs 500,000.

Exchange marriage or Watta Satta is also practiced in many parts of Pakistan. In a watta satta arrangement, both families trade brides. Both families must have a daughter and a son and must be willing to betroth them to the daughter and son of the other family. Watta satta marriages put females in a precarious position as a divorce between one of the couples may trigger a divorce between the other couple because of strong sibling ties. Such marriages are a crime if child marriages are involved in the arrangement.

Section 498-B of the PPC prohibits forced marriages and makes it an offense, punishable with imprisonment extending to seven years but not less than three years and liable to a fine of Rs 500,000.

Generally, a person accused of deceitfully preventing a woman from inheriting property is punishable under section 498-A of the PPC with an imprisonment extending to ten years but not less than five years and a fine of rupees one million or both.

Another custom in Pakistan, called swara or vani, involves village elders solving family disputes or settling unpaid debts by marrying off girls. The average marriage age of swara girls is between 5 and 9. Similarly, the custom of watta satta has been cited as a cause of child marriages in Pakistan.

Consequences 
Over the years, there has been a decline in the occurrence of child marriages but it is lower in case of females than males. 
The trend of child marriages has been a major cause of girls' illiteracy or lower level of education. It can also damage the girls physical, mental and social health leading to serious health issues in the future. Prenatal, neonatal, and maternal health problems are also tied to women married before the age of 18. It is also evident that child marriages are widely prevalent among cultivators and laborers. Dependency on elders and lack of independent occupational aspirations or occupational mobility further hampers the efforts of limiting child marriages. There are, however, spatial trends as indicated by different trends of distinct villages. Exposure to urban areas has helped in reduction of child marriage; and finally, realization of bad effects of child marriages has positive relationship with reduction in child marriage indicating thereby a positive role of general understanding and awareness which is spreading quite fast.

The possibility of mismatches of marriages is high. Infants born to the child mothers are many times feeble. The marital lives remain unhappy and child wives lack happiness due to their life-time inability to support their lot. Many a times, the young wives become vulnerable to sexually transmitted diseases.  The occurrence results in increasing the population growth rate.

The Child Marriage Restraint Act 1929 

Child marriage in Pakistan is legally prohibited to an extent under the Child Marriage Restraint Act 1929 (No XIX). Under the Act, the minimum age for marriage was 18 years for a male and 16 years for a female (section 2). However, under a new bill passed in Pakistani Senate, the minimum age of marriage for female was increased to 18. Contravention is punishable with a fine of Rs.1000 and an imprisonment of one month or both for 
	An adult male (above 18 years of age) who contracts marriage with a child (section 4).
	A person who solemnizes a child marriage (section 5).
	A parent or guardian who does not act to prevent a child marriage (section 6). 
The 1929 Act is one of those few laws on the statute books that were introduced by the founder of Pakistan, Mohammad Ali Jinnah, while he was a member of the British India Legislative Assembly. It was passed on October 1, 1929, to restrain the solemnization of child marriages and applied to the whole of India effective April 1, 1930. It still remains in force, and extends to the whole of Pakistan. It applies to, both Muslim and Non-Muslim, citizens of Pakistan, and regardless of whether they are resident in Pakistan or elsewhere.

Prior to the 1929 Act, the Age of Consent Act in 1892 was enacted which laid down the age below which a marriage should not be consummated. Child marriages however continued unabated. It was in order to control this menace that the 1929 Act was enacted.
The purpose of the Act, as its title signifies, is to restrain the solemnization of child marriages. Child was originally defined in the Act to mean a "person who, if a male, is under 14 years of age, and if a female, is under 12 years of age." The age was subsequently raised. The Muslim Family Laws Ordinance 1961 (No VIII) effective July 15, 1961, raised the age of girl child in the Act from 14 to 16 years of age; and lowered the age of male from 21 to 18 years to the extent of the Muslim citizens; this means that the age for the non-Muslim citizens remains the same as prior to the 1961 Amendment.
The Act, after being amended by the 1961 Ordinance, states that, whoever being a male above 18 years of age, contracts a marriage with a girl child of less than 16 years, shall be punishable with simple imprisonment extending up to one month, or with fine extending up to Rs 1000, or with both.

Additionally whoever performs, conducts or directs any child marriage, defined as marriage to which either of the contracting parties is a child, is punishable with simple imprisonment extending up to one month, or fine extending up to Rs 1000, or with both, unless he proves that he had reason to believe that the marriage was not a child marriage.
Similarly, any person having charge of the minor contracting a child marriage, whether as parent or guardian or in any other capacity, lawful or unlawful,
who does any act to promote the marriage; or
permits it to be solemnized; or
negligently fails to prevent it from being solemnized;
is punishable with simple imprisonment extending up to one month, or with, fine extending up to Rs 1000, or with both, provided that no woman is punishable with imprisonment. For purposes of this section of the Act, it will be presumed under law, unless and until the contrary is proved, that where a minor has contracted a child marriage, the person having charge of such minor has negligently failed to prevent the marriage from being solemnized.
No court other than Magistrate of the first class can take cognizance of, or try, any offense under the Act. However even he cannot take cognizance after the expiry of one year from the date on which the offense is alleged to have been committed; and unless, except in Punjab, a complaint is made by the union council within whose jurisdiction a child marriage is or is about to be solemnized, or if there is no union council in the area by such authority as the provincial government may in this behalf prescribe.

In cases where the court is satisfied from information laid before it through a complaint or otherwise that a child marriage has been arranged or is about to be solemnized, the court may issue an injunction against any of male contracting the marriage; or the persons involved in the performance, conduct or direction of the child marriage; or the persons having charge of the minor whether as parent or guardian or in any other capacity whether lawful or unlawful. No injunction, however, can be issued unless the court has previously given notice to the person concerned, and has afforded him an opportunity to show cause against the issue of the injunction. Such an injunction order can also be rescinded or altered by the court. Disobedience of the injunction order is punishable with imprisonment extending up to three months, or with fine extending up to Rs 1000, or with both, provided that no woman can be punished under this section of the Act.

Child Marriage Restraint (Amendment) Bill, 2018 
In 2019, a bill introduced by Pakistani senator, Sherry Rehman, was passed in the Pakistani Senate to increase the minimum age of marriage for female to 18. The bill was aimed at ending child marriage in Pakistan. The bill was passed with overwhelming majority. However, some Pakistani religious political parties like Jamiat Ulema-e-Islam (JUI-F) and Jamaat-e-Islami (JI) opposed the bill. The parties claimed that the bill was against Islam. However, the senator Sherry Rehman said that the Muslim countries like Oman, Turkey and United Arab Emirates have already set 18 as the minimum age of marriage.

One of the senators, Raza Rabbani, stated that a similar bill Sindh Child Marriage Restraint Act 2013 was passed in Sindh assembly back in 2014 and it was not challenged by anyone at any forum.

References 

 
Marriage in Pakistan
Forced marriage